Sæmundur Gíslason  (13 November 1920 - 2 February 2003) was an Icelandic former footballer. He was part of the Iceland national football team between 1946 and 1951. He played 6 matches.

See also
 List of Iceland international footballers

References

External links
 

Gíslason, Saemundur
Gíslason, Saemundur
Icelandic footballers
Iceland international footballers
Icelandic male footballers
Gíslason, Saemundur